Daniel Dean Jackson Baker (born October 24, 1993) is a Costa Rican-American soccer player.

Career

College
Jackson began playing college soccer at the University of North Carolina at Asheville, before transferring to the University of Denver in 2015 for his senior year.

Professional
Jackson signed a professional contract with USL club Colorado Springs Switchbacks in March 2016.

Coaching
Jackson has held various positions on the coaching staff of the University of Denver. He joined the staff in 2016 as a graduate assistant, moved to the newly created position of video specialist in 2017, and returned in 2019 as a volunteer assistant.

References

External links
Switchbacks bio
Denver Pioneers bio

1993 births
Living people
Costa Rican footballers
UNC Asheville Bulldogs men's soccer players
Denver Pioneers men's soccer players
Colorado Springs Switchbacks FC players
Real Monarchs players
Association football goalkeepers
Soccer players from North Carolina
USL Championship players
Footballers from San José, Costa Rica
People from Chapel Hill, North Carolina
Association football goalkeeping coaches
Denver Pioneers men's soccer coaches